Valery Mikhailovich Zubov (Russian: Валерий Михайлович Зубов; 9 May 1953 - 27 April 2016), was a Russian politician and economist who had served as a member of the State Duma from 2000 to 2016.

Zubov had also served as the second governor of Krasnoyarsk Krai from 1993 to 1998.

He was one of the four co-chairs of the Republican Party of Russia. He was a doctor of Economics, Professor, and specialist in the field of economic statistics. He was the author of four monographs, 27 scientific papers.

He was the professor of the Higher School of Business of Moscow State University named after M. V. Lomonosov.

Biography

Valery Zubov was born on 9 May 1953 to a family of geologists.

In 1970, he graduated from high school in Lermontov, in Stavropol Krai.

In 1970 to 1971, he worked in the Kazakh SSR as a fitter of the assembly and construction department of the Ministry of Medium Machine Building.

He worked as an assistant driller in a geological exploration expedition in the Stavropol Krai, in the village of Arzgir.

In 1971, he entered the Moscow Geological Prospecting Institute named after Sergo Ordzhonikidze, but two years later he decided to transfer to the Moscow Institute of National Economy named after G.V. Plekhanov.

In 1977, he graduated with honors from the Plekhanov Moscow Institute of National Economy with a degree in national economy planning.}

In 1978 to 1979, he served in the Air Defense Forces.

In 1982, at the Moscow Institute of National Economy named after G.V. Plekhanov, he defended his dissertation for the degree of candidate of economic sciences, and, at his own request, was assigned to work in Krasnoyarsk.

Between 1982 and 1988, as well as from 1991 to 1992, he worked at the Krasnoyarsk State University.  He went from senior lecturer to dean of the Faculty of Economics. He became the youngest dean in the country during and after Soviet times.

From 1986 to 1987, he did an internship in the United States at the University of Oklahoma, where he studied the peculiarities of the organization of labor in the US.

From 1988 to 1991, he studied at the doctoral program of the Moscow Institute of Economics and Statistics.

In 1991, at the Moscow Institute of Economics and Statistics, he defended his dissertation for the degree of Doctor of Economics on the topic "Methodology for statistical assessment of the quality of economic growth."

In 1992, Zubov became the Deputy Head of the Administration of the Krasnoyarsk Krai, as the Head of the Main Department of Economics of the Krsi Administration.

On 28 January 1993, Zubov became the acting governor (head) of Krasnoyarsk Krai. Then in April, he was elected the 2nd governor (head) of Krasnoyarsk Krai. In the fall of 1993, he supported the dissolution of the Supreme Soviet of the Russian Federation.

As Governor, he had the nickname "Regional Gaidar".

In 1993, he was nominated as a candidate member of the Federation Council in a two-mandate district from the Krasnoyarsk Krai, and from 1994 to 1995, he was a member of the Federation Council of the 1st convocation (Yenisei District No. 24), a member of the Committee on Budget, Financial, Currency and Credit Regulation, Money Issue, tax policy and customs regulation.

In 1996 to 1998, he was a member of the Federation Council of the 2nd convocation, as a deputy chairman of the Federation Council, and coordinator of the work of committees on socio-economic issues.

On 17 May 1998, Zubov was defeated in the gubernatorial election by Alexander Lebed.

In November 1998, he was the co-chairman of the Siberian socio-political movement "Union for the Future". He was a member of the Interregional Association "Siberian Agreement".

In the late 1990s, he was deputy director of the Krasnoyarsk Universal Commodity and Stock Exchange for operations with securities, as well as the founders of the Troika Krasnoyarsk stock exchange.

In 1999, he was the Professor of the Department of Social and Economic Planning of the Krasnoyarsk State University. He was a member of the National Council for Corporate Governance. He was the president of the International Association of Housing and Mortgage Funds (MAIF). He was the vice president of the Russian Chess Federation. He was a corresponding member of the Academy of Economic Sciences and Entrepreneurship of Russia.

In December 1999, Zubov was elected to the State Duma from the Krasnoyarsk single-mandate constituency No. 48, gaining 33.3% of the vote. He was a member of the deputy group "People's Deputy".

From 2000 to 2002, he was a member of the State Duma Committee on Budget and Taxes.

From 2001 to 2004, he was a member of the working (tripartite) group for improving interbudgetary relations in the Russian Federation. Member of the inter-factional associations "Siberian Agreement", "Energy of Russia", "Business Russia" and "Commodity Producers of Russia". He was a member of three deputy groups in the State Duma for relations with the parliaments of Japan, Canada and Kazakhstan

In April 2002, he was elected Chairman of the State Duma Committee on Credit Organizations and Financial Markets.

In June 2002, from the State Duma, he became a member of the conciliation commission involved in overcoming disagreements on the new version of the law "On the Central Bank of Russia."

From 2002 to 2003 - Chairman of the State Duma Committee on Credit Organizations and Financial Markets.

In December 2003, he was re-elected to the State Duma from the Krasnoyarsk single-mandate constituency No. 50.

He was Deputy Chairman of the Interdepartmental Commission of the Security Council of the Russian Federation on Security in the Economic Sphere.

From 2003 to 2005, he served as First Deputy Chairman of the State Duma Committee on Credit Organizations and Financial Markets. He was a member of the Our Home - Russia party, then a member of the People's Party of the Russian Federation and the United Russia party.

On 23 April 2005, Zubov left the United Russia party and joined the Republican Party of Russia. He also left the United Russia faction in the State Duma.

From 2005 to 2007, he was a member of the political council of the Republican Party of Russia.

In 2007, he headed the electoral list of the A Just Russia party in the elections to the Legislative Assembly of the Krasnoyarsk Krai. The same year he was elected to the State Duma on the electoral list of the Just Russia party (No. 1 in the Krasnoyarsk group). He was a member of the Just Russia faction and a member of the State Duma Committee on Economic Policy and Entrepreneurship.

In 2011, he again headed the party list of A Just Russia in the Krasnoyarsk Krai to participate in the Legislative Assembly. He was again elected to the State Duma the same year.

In 2014, Zubov took fourth place among the richest deputies of the State Duma from the Krasnoyarsk Krai.

Zubov was one of eight members of parliament who voted against the so-called law of Dima Yakovlev, which prohibits the adoption of Russian orphans by foreign citizens. He was also one of three deputies who abstained during the vote on the annexation of Crimea.

Valery Mikhailovich Zubov died on 27 April 2016 in Moscow after a long illness.  He was buried in Moscow at the Troekurovsky cemetery.

On 9 June 2018, in Krasnoyarsk, in memory of Zubov, a memorial plaque was opened on the house number 12 "B" on Menzhinsky Street. It was there that Zubov had lived and worked from 1984 to 2016.

Family

His widow, Yevgenya Zubova is an associate Porofessor of the Russian Academy of Economics. GV Plekhanov. He had a daughter, Yekaterina, son Ivan Valeryevich and grandson Ivan.

References

1953 births
2016 deaths
People from Tambov Oblast
Plekhanov Russian University of Economics alumni
Governors of Krasnoyarsk Krai
Members of the Federation Council of Russia (1994–1996)
Members of the Federation Council of Russia (1996–2000)
Third convocation members of the State Duma (Russian Federation)
Fourth convocation members of the State Duma (Russian Federation)
Fifth convocation members of the State Duma (Russian Federation)
Sixth convocation members of the State Duma (Russian Federation)
A Just Russia politicians
United Russia politicians